The R187 road is a regional road in Ireland, located in County Monaghan. It runs from the N54 to the border, where it continues as the B36 road to Rosslea, County Fermanagh.

References

Regional roads in the Republic of Ireland
Roads in County Monaghan